Jussi Sakari Heikkilä (born 21 March 1983) is a Finnish 400 metre hurdler. His personal best is 49.39 seconds, achieved in May 2008 in Tallahassee, Florida.

He competed at the European Championships in 2002 and at the World Championships in 2009 without reaching the final.

Heikkilä was born in Forssa. He has studied in the United States for a long time and he was fourth at the NCAA Championships in 2008.

Competition record

References

1983 births
Living people
People from Forssa
Finnish male hurdlers
Competitors at the 2005 Summer Universiade
Competitors at the 2007 Summer Universiade
Competitors at the 2009 Summer Universiade
Sportspeople from Kanta-Häme